The Heart of Johnny Cash is the 29th overall album released by country singer Johnny Cash. It was released in 1968 (see 1968 in music). In essence, it is a compilation album, though a handful of new recordings were included. Three songs from the album became moderately successful singles, while a version of "Girl in Saskatoon" was released on Personal File in 2006. The album was only available via Television marketing sales, and was not released to retail stores. It has not been released on CD.

Track listing

Charts
Singles – Billboard (United States)

1968 compilation albums
Johnny Cash compilation albums
Columbia Records compilation albums